Candalides neurapacuna is a species of butterfly of the family Lycaenidae. It is found from southern New Guinea to south-eastern Papua New Guinea.

References

Butterflies described in 1908
Candalidini